The Škoda Octavia is a small family car which was produced by Czechoslovakian automaker AZNP at their plant in Mladá Boleslav from 1959 to 1971. It was introduced in January 1959 and was named Octavia as it was the eighth car produced by the nationalised Škoda company.
The saloon was produced until 1964, when it was replaced by the Škoda 1000 MB. An estate version was introduced in 1961, and remained in production until 1971.

The car was the successor to the Škoda 440/445 on which it was based. It featured redesigned front axles with a coil spring and telescopic shock absorbers rather than a leaf spring as in the 440.

The top speed was 110 to 115 km/h (68 to 71 mph).

The Škoda Octavia engine and gearbox were used in the Trekka light utility vehicle, which was manufactured in New Zealand from 1966 to 1973.

The Octavia name was resurrected in 1996 for a new model.

References

External links

Škoda Auto  Škoda website
 Classic Car Króžek Brno

Octavia
Cars introduced in 1959
1960s cars
1970s cars
Station wagons
Rear-wheel-drive vehicles

de:Škoda 440#Škoda Octavia (1959–1964)